Maximiliano Serrano (born 5 August 1988) is an Argentine professional footballer who plays as a midfielder.

Career
Defensores de Belgrano were Serrano's first club. He played the opening seven years of his career with the club, participating in one hundred and eighty-five matches whilst scoring seven goals; the final two arrived in a Primera B Metropolitana victory over Platense on 24 August 2013. In January 2016, Serrano was signed by Almirante Brown of the third tier. He featured eight times in the 2016 Primera B Metropolitana campaign, with the midfielder netting his first goal on the final day against Comunicaciones. One goal in fifty-two fixtures followed across the next two seasons.

Serrano joined Acassuso on 30 June 2018. Two goals, against San Telmo and All Boys respectively, followed across twenty-seven matches for the club as they reached the promotion play-offs; though they would lose out to All Boys. July 2019 saw Serrano join fellow Primera B Metropolitana team Talleres. He netted on his second appearance against Deportivo Armenio, which came in the midst of six games for them. He departed midway through the season.

Career statistics
.

References

External links

1988 births
Living people
Footballers from Buenos Aires
Argentine footballers
Association football midfielders
Primera B Metropolitana players
Primera C Metropolitana players
Defensores de Belgrano footballers
Club Almirante Brown footballers
Club Atlético Acassuso footballers
Talleres de Remedios de Escalada footballers